The Phylloscyrtini tribe is a group of 21 species of small crickets in the New World, from the eastern United States to Argentina. Little is known about their biology.

The group is characterized by the long maxillary palpi, flattened and widened in the last segment, as well as the tarsal adhesive pads, used to walk on the underside of leaves. Despite their size (less than 10 mm), the notorious colors make them easily recognizable.

They prefer humid and lush habitats, and their reported diet is omnivorous.

Genera and species
Cranistus Stål, 1861
Cranistus bolivianus Hebard, 1931
Cranistus burmeisteri Hebard, 1931
Cranistus canotus (Saussure, 1878)
Cranistus colliurides Stål, 1861
Cranistus macilentus (Saussure, 1878)
Cranistus setosus (Burmeister, 1880)
Cranistus similis (Bruner, 1916)
Phyllopalpus Uhler, 1864
Phyllopalpus batesii Kirby, 1906
Phyllopalpus brunnerianus (Saussure, 1874)
Phyllopalpus caeruleus (Saussure, 1874)
Phyllopalpus nigrovarius Walker, 1869
Phyllopalpus pulchellus Uhler, 1864
Phyllopalpus pulcher Walker, 1869
Phylloscyrtus Guérin-Méneville, 1844
Phylloscyrtus amoenus Burmeister, 1880
Phylloscyrtus cicindeloides Gerstaecker, 1863
Phylloscyrtus elegans Guérin-Méneville, 1844
Phylloscyrtus intermedius Hebard, 1928
Phylloscyrtus rehni Costa Lima, 1958
Phylloscyrtus trinotatus Hebard, 1928
Phylloscyrtus viridicatus (Saussure, 1897)
Phylloscyrtus vittatus Gerstaecker, 1863

References 

Ensifera
Orthoptera of North America
Orthoptera of South America